General Sir Francis Robert Roy Bucher  (31 August 1895 – 5 January 1980) was a British soldier who became the second Commander-in-Chief of the Indian Army and the final non-Indian to hold the top post of the Indian Army after Partition.

Military career
Educated at the Edinburgh Academy, and was commissioned from the Royal Military College, Sandhurst as a Second Lieutenant into the Unattached List for the Indian Army, 15 August 1914. He was attached to the 4th Battalion Cameronians (Scottish Rifles) in the UK from 25 August 1914 to 30 April 1915, when he joined 1st Battalion Cameronians (Scottish Rifles) in France. He remained there until 8 November 1915, when he transferred to the 55th Cokes Rifles in India. Confirmed as a second lieutenant in the Indian Army on 5 September 1915, he was promoted to lieutenant on 15 November 1916 (back-dated to 1 September 1915 on 17 August 1917).

He transferred to the 31st Duke of Connaught's Own Lancers in 1916, and was promoted to acting captain on 23 May 1917, again receiving the rank from 16 October 1917, and was promoted to the substantive rank of captain on 15 August 1918.

After the War he served in Afghanistan and Waziristan, for which he was awarded a Military Cross (MC) on 1 January 1920. and then went to the Staff College, Camberley in 1926. He was appointed a General Staff Officer 3rd Grade from 7 July 1929 to 15 June 1931 then Deputy Assistant Adjutant General from 16 June 1931 to 6 April 1933 for the Deccan District in India. He was promoted to major on 15 August 1932, and brevetted lieutenant-colonel on 1 July 1937.

Promoted to lieutenant-colonel on 1 November 1939, Bucher served in World War II, initially as Commandant of Sam Browne's Cavalry, then Assistant Commandant, Indian Cavalry Training Centre 1 March 1940 to 31 August 1940 then Commandant Indian Cavalry Training Centre 1 September 1940 to 23 January 1941. He was appointed Assistant Adjutant General at GHQ India from 24 January 1941 to 23 June 1941. He was made Assistant Quartermaster General in Iraq later that year and was put in charge of Administration at Southern Command in India on 21 March 1942, with the acting rank of major-general. He was promoted to colonel on 21 July 1942 (with seniority from 1 July 1940), and advanced to temporary major-general on 21 March 1943. Appointed a Companion of the Order of the Bath (CB) in the 1945 New Year Honours, Bucher was promoted to the substantive rank of major-general on 6 April 1945 (with seniority from 5 June 1944).

After the War he was appointed General Officer Commanding Bengal and Assam Area in India. Promoted to acting lieutenant-general on 4 August 1946, he became General Officer Commanding-in-Chief of Eastern Command in India and then, between 1 January 1948 and 15 January 1949, he served as the Commander-in-Chief, Indian Army. His service was not without controversy and in 2023 his advice to Prime Minister Jawaharlal Nehru over agreeing to a ceasefire over Kashmir was publicly reported.

Appointed a Knight Commander of the Order of the British Empire, Military Division (KBE) in the 1948 King's Birthday Honours, he retired on 9 October 1949 with the honorary rank of general and was promoted to major-general on the reserve list on 26 September 1950, retaining the honorary rank of general.

References

|-

1895 births
1980 deaths
People educated at Edinburgh Academy
Knights Commander of the Order of the British Empire
Companions of the Order of the Bath
Recipients of the Military Cross
Cameronians officers
British Army personnel of World War I
Indian Army personnel of World War I
Graduates of the Royal Military College, Sandhurst
Indian Army generals of World War II
Chiefs of Army Staff (India)
British Indian Army generals
Graduates of the Staff College, Camberley